The 2013 Hazfi Cup Final was the 26th final since 1975. The match was the ''Iran's El-classico between Persepolis and Sepahan. This was the clubs' second meeting in the final where Sepahan won 4–2 over Persepolis in the penalties in 2006. The match was also the last match of Persepolis captain Mehdi Mahdavikia, a former Iran national football team and Hamburg SV midfielder. Sepahan won Persepolis for another time in penalties and crowned their 4th domestic cup title. Sepahan was qualified for the group stage of the 2014 AFC Champions League.

Format
The tie was contested over one legs, simply to last edition. If the teams could still not be separated, then extra time would have been played with a penalty shootout (taking place if the teams were still level after that).

Road to the finals

Persepolis
Persepolis's head coach Manuel José de Jesus was sacked ten days before Persepolis' first match in domestic cup campaign and his assistant and former captain Yahya Golmohammadi was appointed as the caretaker head coach. Golmohammadi's first match in charge occurred on the Round of 32, which they faced Malavan, match ends 6–0, same with Persepolis' best win over Esteghlal in Tehran derby in 1973. Persepolis also defeated another Iran Pro League side, Naft Tehran with their technicians coach Mansour Ebrahimzadeh 4–1. Persepolis faced Zob Ahan in quarter-finals and won the match 1–0 with a late goal from Mohammad Nouri in extra time. Their match with Damash Gilan was also ends 1–1 after extra time and Persepolis won that match in the penalties.

Sepahan
Sepahan began their campaign with hosting Foolad in Isfahan. Foolad was eliminated Sepahan on the last edition at the same stadium but Sepahan won the match 2–1 with goals comes from Mohammad Gholami and Mohammad Reza Khalatbari and Luciano Pereira was foolad's scorer. On the Round of 16, Sepahan faced with second tier side, Mes Rafsanjan, match ends 1–0 for Sepahan after extra time. Sepahan also defeated Sanat Naft 2–0 and was qualified to semi-final to face with powerhouse Esteghlal. Esteghlal was defending champion and match was ends 1–1 after extra time and goes to penalties. Sepahan won 5–4 on penalties and qualified to their 4th final in last 10 years.

Pre-match

Match history
Persepolis appeared in six Hazfi Cup Finals before this match. They won the cup in 1988, 1992, 1999, 2010 and 2011 and were runners-up in 2006. This was Sepahan's fourth appearance in a Hazfi Cup Final, having won in 2004, 2006 and 2007. The teams had met 50 times in the Iranian Football League. Persepolis won 17 times, Sepahan 12 times and the other 21 games were drawn.

Ticketing
Ticket prices for the final started at 2,000 toman and were also available at 5,000 and 10,000 with all of the incomes was awarded to a charitable foundation to spend for the people involved in Bushehr and Sistan earthquakes. The Cup winners received 50,000,000 from the IRIFF while the runners-up was earned 25,000,000 tomans.

Venue
Team officials met with each other on 1 April 2013 to decide on the final venue. After they failed to agree on a venue between Ghadir Stadium in Ahvaz, Samen Stadium in Mashhad and Sahand Stadium in Tabriz, the final venue was decided with a draw which 100,000 capacity Azadi Stadium (the Persepolis F.C. home Stadium) was announced as the venue for the 2013 final.

Officials
FIFA listed referee, Alireza Faghani who also refereed the 2012 edition final was announced as the final match referee by IRIFF's referees committee. Hassan Kamranifar, the assistant referee of 2010 FIFA World Cup and Reza Sokhandan helped Faghani. Yadollah Soleimani was the fourth official.

Kit colors
Sepahan wore their yellow home kit for the Final. They also used the away dressing room.

Detalis

|valign="top"|

Statistics

Source: Varzesh3

See also 
 2012–13 Persian Gulf Cup
 2012–13 Azadegan League
 2012–13 Iran Football's 2nd Division
 2012–13 Iran Football's 3rd Division
 2012–13 Hazfi Cup
 Iranian Super Cup
 2012–13 Iranian Futsal Super League

References

2013
Haz
Sepahan S.C. matches
Persepolis F.C. matches